Athol William Smith (1913–1953) was an Australian rugby league footballer who played in the 1930s, 1940s and 1950s. A Queensland and Country New South Wales representative forward, he played club football in Sydney for Western Suburbs and Balmain (with whom he won the 1939 and 1944 NSWRFL Premierships and also later coached)

Playing career

Smith played seven seasons for the Balmain club between 1939 and 1945. He was a dual premiership winner with the Tigers, winning both the 1939 and the 1944 grand finals with them. 

He later coached the club between 1948-1950. In 1953, whilst playing for Toowoomba's Souths club, Smith was selected to play for Queensland against the touring United States team.

Death
Smith died on 22 September, 1953, aged 40.

References

1913 births
1953 deaths
Australian rugby league players
Balmain Tigers coaches
Balmain Tigers players
Country New South Wales rugby league team players
Queensland rugby league team players
Rugby league second-rows
Rugby league players from Lismore, New South Wales
Western Suburbs Magpies players